Luxor 2 is an action-oriented casual puzzle game developed by MumboJumbo. First released in 2006, it is the sequel to the original Luxor, which was released in 2005.  The title can be played online at several different sites, and can be purchased for Microsoft Windows, Mac OS X, and Xbox Live Arcade.

The game's console debut was on June 11, 2008, with its release via Xbox Live Arcade. It can be purchased directly from the Xbox Live Marketplace.

Luxor 2 is also available in a Windows Vista-only version from MSN Games which includes improved graphics over the previous computer versions.

Luxor 2 HD is also available in a Windows 11-only version from Microsoft Store.

Gameplay
The game challenges the user to eliminate colored magical spheres by causing three or more spheres of the same color to collide. Players do this primarily by shooting additional spheres from a winged scarab which they guide back and forth along the bottom of the screen. When spheres are eliminated, adjacent spheres which now form a segment of three or more or the same color will also explode in a chain reaction.

During gameplay, the on-screen spheres continuously move forward, pushed by additional small scarabs. If any sphere reaches the player's pyramid, he or she loses a life and is forced to restart the stage. If the player succeeds in eliminating a certain number of spheres without this occurring, new spheres cease to arrive and the level can be completed by removing those which remain.

There are a total of 88 rounds of increasing difficulty, plus 13 bonus rounds which the player can play through. In "Story mode", the player earns titles/rankings as he or she progresses through the various levels.  Multiple difficulty settings are available as well, with play at higher settings yielding higher scores.

Levels and stages

The arrangement of the levels of Luxor 2 are similar to the arrangement of rounds in Zuma. There are four levels in the first stage, five in the second, and six in the third. The order of levels repeats after every third stage, however, one stage is added in this repetition. For example, levels 1–1 to 1-4 are repeated as levels 4–1 to 4-4, but level 4-5 is added. Levels 4–1 to 4-5 are repeated as levels 7–1 to 7–5, but level 7-6 is added. This is also true for the other levels, except that for the 13th and 14th stage, with five additional levels in 13th stage and four in 14th stage before entering level 14–5, the last level.

Scoring 
In general, 100 points are awarded for each sphere destroyed.  The simple destruction of three spheres thus earns 300 points, four spheres 400, etc.  However, if you arrange things such that
you destroy three spheres which bring together three more spheres, the second set of spheres has a 2X multiplier.  With cleverness, you can arrange things such that you have several chain
reactions in a row with linearly increasing multipliers at every stage of the chain reaction.

At the end of every round (and at times during the round) jewels, rings, and coins are freed.  
Every stage has coins, and coins have a value of 250 points at all stages of game play (One collects coins less for their
value than because every 30 coins earns an extra life.)    
In contrast to the behavior of coins, jewel and ring values increase in a simple pattern as play progresses.  
Every stage has two types of jewel and one type of
ring.  
Below are the listed the jewels and rings in the first five stages of play:

Jewels and Rings vs. Stage

Stage 1
(comprising rounds 1–1 to 1–4)
 Orange octahedral jewel (500)
 Rose quartz jewel (750)
 Gold ring (1000)

Stage 2
(comprising rounds 2–1 to 2–5)
 Rose quartz jewel (750)
 Gold ring (1000)
 Dark purple guitar-pick shaped jewel (1250)

Stage 3
(comprising rounds 3–1 to 3–6)
 Gold ring (1000)
 Dark purple guitar-pick shaped jewel (1250)
 Green octahedral jewel (1500)

Stage 4
 Dark purple guitar-pick shaped jewel (1250)
 Green octahedral jewel (1500)
 Gold and colored-enamel ring (1750)

Stage 5
 Green octahedral jewel (1500)
 Gold and colored-enamel ring (1750)
 Amber icosahedral jewel (2000)

Inspecting the above list reveals a pattern, which has been verified to be consistent throughout all 14 stages of game-play.
At each stage N, the value of the "mean" jewel is 500+250*N.  Each stage also has a jewel or ring with a value
250 points less than the mean and another valued 250 points greater than the mean.  As one advances to the
next stage, the least valuable jewel/ring drops out and a new one is added in the most valuable spot.
A new ring appears every three stage.  Thus at the 14th and highest stage, one would expect the mean jewel to have the
value 500+250*14=4000 points.

Power-ups
The title includes between 13 and 15 different power-ups which can be collected during play. These are earned by successfully setting off three or more explosions in a row. When this occurs, a random power-up falls down towards the player's winged scarab, but is only actually collected if the player correctly positions the scarab to catch it. Once a power-up is collected, it either has an immediate effect, or modifies the next sphere which the player will   launch, depending on type.                                                                    Unique or new power-ups include:                                                                
 Color Cloud - Causes a cloud effect which changes the color of all spheres it envelopes to the matching color.
 Lightning Storm - Causes a series of ten lightning blasts to strike and randomly eliminate spheres.                                                                                       
 Net- collects falling objects all across the playfield.   
 Pharaoh's Dagger - Changes the player's "next sphere" into a dagger which can be used to destroy any spheres it hits for a period of time.

Additional power-ups are modeled after those from existing games, such as one which slows down the movement of the spheres, and one which causes the spheres to move backward for a short while.

Cheats (PC version only)
In the Options menu, press the Page Up and Page Down at the
same to activate the cheat mode. A new button, "Cheats", 
will appear. It will be valid only to this specific profile.  
Cheat mode makes all stages and levels of game play accessible.

Luxor: Pharaoh's Challenge

Luxor: Pharaoh's Challenge is a remake of Luxor 2 for the Nintendo DS, Wii, PlayStation Portable, and PlayStation 2. released on November 20, 2007, for PS2, December 18, 2007, for both PSP and DS, and January 15, 2008, for Wii. Unlike the original Luxor 2, the remake introduces blessings to help the player on his or her journey to the Temple of Set. The graphics are different on every platform.

The game has a story where a songstress speaks with Thoth about the adventures of a hero who stopped Set from destroying the world.

References

2006 video games
MacOS games
Video games developed in the United States
Video games scored by Adam Gubman
Video games set in Egypt
Windows games
Xbox 360 Live Arcade games
PlayStation 2 games
PlayStation Portable games
Wii games
Nintendo DS games
MumboJumbo games
Tile-matching video games